The Square du Temple is a garden in Paris, France in the  3rd arrondissement, established in 1857. It is one of 24 city squares planned and created by Georges-Eugène Haussmann and Jean-Charles Adolphe Alphand. The Square occupies the site of a medieval fortress in Paris, built by the Knights Templar. Parts of the fortress were later used as a prison during the French Revolution, and then demolished by the mid-19th century.

History

Knights Templar
The order of the Knights Templar began in the 12th century, first constructing a fort (Vieux Temple or Old Temple) in Le Marais. In the 13th century, a new fortress was built as their European headquarters. The enclosure, called enclos du Temple, originally featured a number of buildings important to the running of the order, and included a church and a massive turreted keep known as Grosse Tour (great tower), which housed a number of the order's prized possessions, and a smaller tower called Tour de César (Caesar's Tower).

French Revolution

The Temple is also known for having been the place where the French royal family was jailed at the time of the Revolution. Members of the royal family imprisoned at the Temple's tower were:

 King Louis XVI, from 13 August 1792 to 21 January 1793, when he was taken to be guillotined at the Place de la Révolution;
 Marie Antoinette, from 13 August 1792 to 1 August 1793 in the Temple's tower. She was then brought to the Conciergerie, from where she eventually was also taken to the guillotine;
 Madame Élisabeth, who stayed for 21 months at the tower before being taken on 9 May 1794 to the Conciergerie and guillotined the following day;
 Louis XVII, from 13 August 1792 until his death of tuberculosis at the tower on 8 June 1795, at the age of ten;
 Princess Marie-Thérèse, who stayed at the tower for three years and four months before being sent into exile.

Demolition

By 1808, the Temple had become a place of pilgrimage for royalists, so Napoleon ordered its demolition, which took two years. Remnants were demolished around 1860 under orders from Napoleon III.

Today

Today its location is a station of the Paris Metro, serving the carreau du temple (covered market) and the Palais de Justice (Courthouse) of the third arrondissement.

The garden includes a gazebo, a playground for children, lawns with the largest open to the public from 15 April to 15 October, fountains and a pond with an artificial waterfall, built from rocks brought in from the forest of Fontainebleau. The grid surrounding the square was designed by the architect Gabriel Davioud. The square contains almost 200 varieties of plants, including many exotic species, such as hazel, a Ginkgo biloba, a Honey locust of America, a Pterocarya fraxinifolia, goldenrain tree, Cedrela, and Chinese quince.

In 2007, the square received the "ecological green spaces" awarded by ECOCERT, the international organic certification.

There are two statues. One represents the songwriter Pierre-Jean de Béranger, who lived on the nearby street which later took his name.  This is the second statue of him; a first bronze statue, by Amédée Donatien Doublemard, was erected with a public subscription held in 1879 by the newspaper "La Chanson", and was destroyed in 1941. It was replaced in 1953 with the present stone statue, by Henri Lagriffoul.

Another statue, a bust on a pedestal, is dedicated: "To B. Wilhelm 1781-1842, founder of the French " above a medallion portrait that bears the inscription "To Eugène Delaporte 1818-1886, propagator".

On 26 October 2007, a monument was inaugurated on the lawn of the main square of the Temple. It carries the names and ages of 85 "little ones who did not have time to attend school", Jewish children from 2 months to 6 years living in the 3rd arrondissement and deported between 1942 and 1944 and then murdered in Auschwitz. This monument was unveiled in the presence of several hundred people, city and district elected officials, representatives of associations and the Sons and Daughters of Jewish Deportees from France.  The memorial is one of several honouring the 11,400 Jewish children deported from France.  The lists of children were compiled from school and civic records by Serge Klarsfeld.

In literature
In Patrick O'Brian's Aubrey-Maturin series, Capt. Jack Aubrey, Dr. Stephen Maturin and a young Lithuanian officer, Jagiello, are held prisoner at the Temple Prison in The Surgeon's Mate.

References

External links

Buildings and structures completed in the 13th century
Castles in Île-de-France
Defunct prisons in Paris
Former buildings and structures in Paris
3rd arrondissement of Paris
4th arrondissement of Paris
Buildings and structures demolished in 1810
French Revolution